Nannoarctia integra, described by Francis Walker in 1855, is an endemic species of moth in the family Erebidae from the Philippines. The species is often confused with N. takanoi (Sonan, 1934) (=integra Matsumura, 1931) from Taiwan.

References
 

Moths described in 1855
Spilosomina